This article lists the representatives of the Co-Princes of Andorra —originally the Bishop of Urgell and the Count of Foix; currently, the Bishop of Urgell and the President of France. The Co-Princes appoint the representatives to represent them in matters of the state, similar to the function of a governor-general or viceroy. Until the Constitution of 1993 was enacted, the Episcopal and French representatives were titled Veguers and Viguiers respectively. They are now titled the Personal Representatives of their respective Co-Prince.

Episcopal representatives

French representatives

See also

References

Princes of Andorra
Politics of Andorra